Frank J. Lawless (10 October 1870 – 16 April 1922) was an Irish revolutionary and politician who served as a Sinn Féin Teachta Dála (TD) for Dublin North from 1919 to 1922. He was a farmer at Saucerstown, Swords, County Dublin, and a member of a widely connected North Dublin family identified with the National movement. He was an early member of Sinn Féin and of the Gaelic League. 

Frank Lawless took part in the 1916 Easter Rising, being second-in-command under Thomas Ashe in the fight at Ashbourne, County Meath. Two of his sons were also combatants on that occasion. As a result, he was condemned to death, but the sentence was commuted to ten years' penal servitude. He was imprisoned at Lewes with Harry Boland. He was released in the general amnesty of 1917. He was again arrested in connection with the "German Plot" and was confined in Usk prison. He was paroled to permit him to take part in the 1918 election, was present at the declaration at Balbriggan but returned to Usk prison on the same day. After his release from Usk he was interned in Ballykinlar Camp. Ashe was Frank Lawless's commanding officer, when the latter served with 4th section, Cork no.1 brigade during the war of independence. Lawless took an active part in the battle of Ashbourne, being battalion quartermaster. A victory for the Irish volunteers, who defeated a superior number of RIC at the crossroads of Ballyannan on the Friday of Easter Week. Coming from the south in a reserve position from behind a hedgerow, his men were fired on by their own 1st section by mistake. But many of the police lay dead in the ditches, and other surrendered, thanks to timely planning and courageous leadership from Mulcahy and Ashe, respectively. It was a wider attempt to raise rebellion outside Dublin.

At the 1918 general election, he was elected as part of the Sinn Féin landslide, defeating the Nationalist J. J. Clancy, who had sat for the Dublin North seat since 1885, by 9,138 to 4,428. Like the other Sinn Féin members, Lawless did not take his seat at Westminster but took part in the revolutionary First Dáil. He was re-elected in 1921 to the Second Dáil for the new Dublin County constituency. He was one of the majority of 64–57 who voted in favour of ratification of the Anglo-Irish Treaty in the critical debate of 7 January 1922.

He died three months later at the age of 51 from injuries received when the pony trap in which he was riding was accidentally upset. He was buried with full military honours at Killossery Cemetery, Rolestown. His funeral was supposedly one of the final times Michael Collins and Éamon de Valera would stand side by side. He was married with six sons and five daughters.

References

Bibliography
 Augusteijn, Joost, From the Public Defiance to Guerilla Warfare. The Experience of Ordinary Volunteers in the Irish War of Independence 1916-1921 (Dublin 1996)
 Brian M. Walker (ed.), Parliamentary Election Results in Ireland, 1801–1922, Dublin, Royal Irish Academy, 1978
 Dod's Parliamentary Companion, London, 1920
Freeman's Journal, 30 December 1918, 17 April 1922, 19 April 1922
 David Fitzpatrick, Harry Boland's Irish Revolution, Cork University Press, 2003, p. 410, citing Irish Independent, 17 and 19 April 1922.
 O'Reilly, Terence (ed.) Our Struggle For Independence: Eye-Witness Accounts From the Pages of An Cosantóir (Cork 2009), pp. 121–137.
 Townshend, Charles, Easter 1916: The Irish Rebellion (London 2006)

1870 births
1922 deaths
Irish farmers
Early Sinn Féin TDs
Members of the 1st Dáil
Members of the 2nd Dáil
Members of the Parliament of the United Kingdom for County Dublin constituencies (1801–1922)
Politicians from County Dublin
UK MPs 1918–1922